Gang Related, alternatively known as Criminal Intent, is a 1997 American action crime thriller film written and directed by Jim Kouf starring James Belushi, Tupac Shakur, Dennis Quaid, Lela Rochon, David Paymer and James Earl Jones. The film revolves around two corrupt cops (Belushi and Shakur) who attempt to frame a homeless man (Quaid) for the murder of an undercover DEA agent that they themselves had actually killed.

The film was shot over a period of a month in August 1996 and wrapped filming just two weeks before Tupac Shakur’s death on September 13, 1996. It marked his final film appearance and was released a year after his death.

Synopsis
Vice squad detectives Frank Divinci and Jake Rodriguez set up narcotics runner Lionel Hudd in a bogus drug trafficking deal; they execute Hudd and pocket his money. Having recovered the cocaine Hudd purchased from them, the detectives return that to the evidence room at their headquarters. When Divinci and Rodriguez find out Hudd was actually a "deep cover" DEA agent — because Hudd's partner, Richard Simms, drops by their precinct for help sniffing out the killers — they resolve to pin the murder on any likely suspect they can find.

The detectives finally frame a homeless drunk named "Joe Doe", by tricking him into confessing to the crime. Needing a witness, Divinci and Rodriguez press stripper Cynthia Webb — with whom Divinci has been cheating on his wife — into picking Joe out of a police lineup. It turns out Joe is actually William Dane McCall, a physician hailing from a wealthy family, who has been missing and presumed dead for years; the family's lawyer, Arthur Baylor, is brought in to defend him. At McCall's trial, he is promptly shown to be innocent. The case falls apart and McCall is released.

Rodriguez records a conversation with Divinci in which the latter admits to Hudd's killing and McCall's setup. In response, Divinci forces Rodriguez out of the car at gunpoint. Returning to his apartment, Rodriguez is met by his bookie Vic, and by Vic's bodyguard, "Mr. Cutlass Supreme". They murder Rodriguez over an outstanding gambling debt. Investigating Rodriguez's death, the police find the damaged tape which contains Divinci's confession. Baylor questions Webb about Hudd's murder, playing back the plan by Divinci to kill her as a loose end. Webb tells Baylor everything she knows about Divinci's crimes. Divinci hides out in Webb's apartment and shoots her for betraying him. Webb is rushed to the hospital; her gurney is wheeled past Doctor McCall. Divinci arranges for a limousine ride to the airport. The driver is revealed to be recently-acquitted serial killer Clyde David Dunner, who murders Divinci and abandons the limousine in an alley.

Cast
 James Belushi as Detective Franklin "Frank" Divinci
 Tupac Shakur as Detective Jacob "Jake" Rodriguez
 James Handy as Captain Henderson
 Deborah Rennard as Caroline Divinci
 Lela Rochon as Cynthia Webb
 Dennis Quaid as William McCall / Joe Doe
 Tom Ormeny as Nathan McCall
 James Earl Jones as Arthur Baylor
 David Paymer as Elliot Goff
 Gary Cole as DEA Agent Richard Simms
 Wendy Crewson as District Attorney Helen Eden
 Terrence C. Carson as Manny Ladrew
 Brad Greenquist as Assistant District Attorney Richard Stein 
 Kool Mo Dee as DEA Agent Lionel Hudd
 Robert LaSardo as DEA Agent Sarkasian
 Gregory Scott Cummins as Clyde David Dunner
 Tommy "Tiny" Lister Jr. as 'Cutlass Supreme'
 Perry Anzilotti as Vic (bookie)

Reception
Gang Related opened in North America on October 8, 1997 in 1,260 theaters. It made $2,443,237 on its opening weekend with an average of $1,939 per theater, ranking at No. 10 at the box office. The film ended up earning $5,906,773. The film received mixed reviews, and has the rating of 50% on Rotten Tomatoes, based on 20 reviews, with an average rating of 5.4 out of 10. On Metacritic — which assigns a weighted mean score — the film has a score of 49 out of 100 based on 28 critics, indicating "mixed or average reviews". Audiences polled by CinemaScore gave the film an average grade of "C+" on an A+ to F scale.

The film was released in the United Kingdom on August 14, 1998, and opened on #11. Roger Ebert appraised the film more positively in an episode of At the Movies:

About the movie's reception and box office results, Jim Belushi said: "Right around that time, when that movie came out, there was a gang related shooting at a movie theater in Los Angeles. That just ruined the opening of that movie. Everyone was afraid to go to the movie theatre, especially with the title Gang Related. Nobody went. Regardless, it’s become kind of a cult film since its release."

Soundtrack

References

External links
 
 
 
 

American crime thriller films
1997 crime thriller films
1990s legal films
1990s mystery thriller films
1997 films
American mystery thriller films
American courtroom films
American legal films
American gang films
Films set in Los Angeles
Films shot in Los Angeles
Orion Pictures films
Metro-Goldwyn-Mayer films
1990s English-language films
Films directed by Jim Kouf
1990s American films